Psolodesmus is a genus of broad-winged damselflies in the family Calopterygidae. There are at least two described species in Psolodesmus.

Species
These two species belong to the genus Psolodesmus:
 Psolodesmus kuroiwae Oguma, 1913
 Psolodesmus mandarinus McLachlan, 1870

References

Further reading

External links

 

Calopterygidae
Articles created by Qbugbot